Na Inspanning Volgt Ontspanning Sparta, commonly known as Nivo Sparta, is a football club from Zaltbommel, Netherlands. The club was founded in 1953. In 2019 it returned to the Eerste Klasse after winning a section championship in the Tweede Klasse. It had previous played in the Eerste Klasse 2005 to 2014, parsed with three years (one year and two years) in the Hoofdklasse.

References

External links
 Official site

Football clubs in the Netherlands
Football clubs in Gelderland
Association football clubs established in 1953
1953 establishments in the Netherlands
Sport in Zaltbommel